Børge Krogh (18 April 1942 – 7 September 2022) was a Danish boxer. He competed at the 1960 Summer Olympics and the 1964 Summer Olympics.

References

External links

1942 births
2022 deaths
Danish male boxers
Olympic boxers of Denmark
Boxers at the 1960 Summer Olympics
Boxers at the 1964 Summer Olympics
Sportspeople from Aalborg
Featherweight boxers